The 1973–74 Cleveland Crusaders season was the Cleveland Crusaders' second season of operation in the World Hockey Association. The Crusaders placed second in the Eastern Division, qualifying for the playoffs. The Crusaders lost in the first round to the Toronto Toros.

Offseason

Regular season

Final standings

Game log

Playoffs

Toronto Toros 4, Cleveland Crusaders 1 - Division Semifinals

Player stats

Note: Pos = Position; GP = Games played; G = Goals; A = Assists; Pts = Points; +/- = plus/minus; PIM = Penalty minutes; PPG = Power-play goals; SHG = Short-handed goals; GWG = Game-winning goals
      MIN = Minutes played; W = Wins; L = Losses; T = Ties; GA = Goals-against; GAA = Goals-against average; SO = Shutouts;

Awards and records

Transactions

Draft picks
Cleveland's draft picks at the 1973 WHA Amateur Draft.

Farm teams

See also
1973–74 WHA season

References

External links

Cleveland Crusaders seasons
Cleve
Cleve